Maurice Armand Albert Passelecq (3 June 1875 – unknown) was a sailor from Belgium, who represented his country at the 1924 Summer Olympics in Le Havre, France.

References

Sources
 
 

Belgian male sailors (sport)
Sailors at the 1924 Summer Olympics – 8 Metre
Olympic sailors of Belgium
1875 births
Year of death missing